Elections to the French National Assembly were held in French Togoland on 10 November 1946 as part of the wider French elections. Previously Togoland had formed a single constituency with neighbouring Dahomey, but the new 1946 constitution had separated the two territories, giving Togoland one seat in the Assembly. It was won by Martin Aku of the Committee of Togolese Unity, who received 34% of the vote.

Results

References

Togo
1946 in French Togoland
1946 3
November 1946 events in Africa